This list of fossil arthropods described in 2017 is a list of new taxa of trilobites, fossil insects, crustaceans, arachnids and other fossil arthropods of every kind that are scheduled to be described during the year 2017, as well as other significant discoveries and events related to arthropod paleontology that are scheduled to occur in the year 2017.

Arachnids

Research
 A study on the anatomy of the Carboniferous whip spider Graeophonus anglicus, as well as on the phylogenetic relationships of fossil whip spiders, is published by Garwood et al. (2017).
 A study on the morphological diversity of fossil species belonging to the family Archaeidae compared with the diversity of extant species is published by Wood (2017).
 A specimen of the tick species Cornupalpatum burmanicum entangled in a pennaceous feather of an early bird or non-avian pennaraptoran theropod is described from the Cretaceous amber from Myanmar by Peñalver et al. (2017).

New taxa

Crustaceans

Research
 A study on the identification of sexual morphs and the reproductive system of the Early Cretaceous clam shrimp Eosestheria middendorfii is published by Hethke et al. (2017).
 A study on the Cretaceous clam shrimp Xibeiestheria pora, identifying new taxonomic features, is published by Li (2017).
 Fossil specimen which might be a barnacle nauplius is described from the Upper Jurassic Solnhofen Limestone (Germany) by Nagler et al. (2017).
 Three specimens of zoea-type malacostracan larvae, showing similarities to the larvae of the lobster Nephrops norvegicus, are described from the Late Jurassic Solnhofen limestone (Germany) by Haug & Haug (2017).
 A study on the anatomy of two specimens of Urda rostrata from the Middle Jurassic (Bathonian) of Germany is published by Nagler, Hyžný & Haug (2017), who interpret this species as the oldest fossil parasitic isopod known to date.
 Isolated, small fossils from North America, Europe, Africa and Asia, the oldest of which were recovered from the Oligocene (Chattian) Chickasawhay Limestone (Alabama, United States), are interpreted as remains of alpheid shrimps by Hyžný et al. (2017).
 A redescription of the shrimps Aeger brevirostris and Archeosolenocera straeleni from the Middle Jurassic La Voulte-sur-Rhône Lagerstätte (France) is published by Jauvion, Charbonnier & Bernard (2017), who consider the species Antrimpos secretaniae to be a junior synonym of Archeosolenocera straeleni.
 New fossils of members of the crab genus Cenomanocarcinus, as well as the southernmost record of the species Necrocarcinus woodwardii, are reported from the Cretaceous of Spain by Ossó (2017).
 Claw fragments of the trichodactylid crabs are described from the Eocene and Oligocene Pozo Formation, Oligocene Chambira Formation (Peru) and Miocene Solimões Formation (Brazil) by Klaus et al. (2017), representing the oldest records of the family reported so far.
 A revision of the genus Eryma is published by Devillez & Charbonnier (2017), who consider the genera Protoclytiopsis Birshtein (1958) and Galicia Garassino & Krobicki (2002) to be junior synonyms of the genus Eryma.

New taxa

Malacostracans

Ostracods

Other crustaceans

Insects

Trilobites

Research
 Three specimens of Megistaspis (Ekeraspis) hammondi preserving appendages and digestive tract are described from the Ordovician Fezouata Konservat-Lagerstätte (Morocco) by Gutiérrez-Marco et al. (2017).
 A moulted specimen of Telephina intermedia with one of the compound eyes showing traces of serious damage which has healed is described from the Ordovician (Darriwilian) Elnes Formation (Norway) by Schoenemann, Clarkson & Høyberget (2017).
 Eggs preserved with two specimens of Triarthrus eatoni are described from the Ordovician Lorraine Group (upstate New York, United States) by Hegna, Martin & Darroch (2017).
 Extraordinarily preserved appendages of the metadoxidid species Hongshiyanaspis yiliangensis are described from the Cambrian Hongjingshao Formation (Yunnan, China) by Zeng et al. (2017).
 Digestive structures of two species of Cambrian trilobites from China (Palaeolenus lantenoisi and Redlichia mansuyi) are described by Hopkins et al. (2017).
 Remnants of cellular systems are identified in the compound eye of Schmidtiellus reetae from the Cambrian of Estonia by Schoenemann, Pärnaste & Clarkson (2017).

New taxa

Other arthropods

Research
 Nielsen, Rasmussen & Harper (2017) confirm the presence of dimorphism in a large sample of individuals of Isoxys volucris from the Cambrian Sirius Passet Lagerstätte (Greenland), which they interpret as likely sexual dimorphism.
 A redescription of Utahcaris orion based on a restudy of the original material is published by Legg & Pates (2017).
 A study on the phylogenetic relationships of Enalikter aphson is published by Parry, Legg & Sutton (2017), who support the original interpretation of the species as an arthropod.
 A study on the lateral tail flexibility in the eurypterid Slimonia acuminata based on a new specimen is published by Persons & Acorn (2017).
 Traces produced by swimming eurypterids are described from the Silurian Williamsville Formation (Ontario, Canada) and Tonoloway Formation (Pennsylvania, United States) by Vrazo & Ciurca (2017), who name a new ichnotaxon Arcuites bertiensis.
 Description of the anatomy of the Triassic horseshoe crab species Yunnanolimulus luopingensis based on specimens with well preserved appendages and soft tissues, recovered from the Guanling Formation (China), is published by Hu et al. (2017).
 A study on the phylogenetic relationships of Rhyniognatha hirsti is published by Haug & Haug (2017) who consider this taxon to be more likely a myriapod (possibly a centipede) rather than an insect.
 A study on the age of the Cowie Harbour Fish Bed (Scotland, United Kingdom), containing fish and arthropod fossils (including the millipede Pneumodesmus newmani), is published by Suarez et al. (2017).
 A study on the microstructural details of the cuticle of the concavicarid thylacocephalans from the Devonian (Famennian) of Poland, identifying possible remains of sensory system, is published by Broda & Zatoń (2017).
 A review of the research history, distribution, anatomy, ontogeny and inferred mode of life of Agnostus pisiformis is published by Eriksson & Horn (2017), who also present enlarged three-dimensional sculptural models of members of the species.
 A restudy of the Burgess Shale arthropod Habelia based on known and new specimens is published by Aria & Caron (2017), who interpret Habelia as a close relative of Sanctacaris uncata and name a new arachnomorph order Habeliida.

New taxa

References

See also

2017 in paleontology

2017 in paleontology
2010s in paleontology
2017 in science